Legends Never Die is the third studio album by American rapper and singer Juice Wrld. It was posthumously released by Grade A Productions and Interscope Records on July 10, 2020. The album follows Juice Wrld's death from a drug-related seizure seven months prior, on December 8, 2019. It features guest appearances from the Weeknd, Trippie Redd, Marshmello, Polo G, the Kid Laroi, and Halsey.

Legends Never Die received generally positive reviews and debuted atop the US Billboard 200 with 497,000 album-equivalent units in its first week. It also reached number one in several other countries, including Australia, Canada, Ireland and the United Kingdom. The album was supported by six singles: "Righteous", "Tell Me U Luv Me", "Life's a Mess", "Come & Go", "Wishing Well", and "Smile".

Background
In January 2020, a month following Juice Wrld's death, it was reported that at least two thousand songs were recorded before he died. 26 of these were leaked onto the streaming platform SoundCloud by the user "999 WRLD". Juice's label (Grade A) and family released a statement regarding his unreleased music:

On May 4, 2020, Juice's girlfriend Ally Lotti referenced an album under the title of The Outsiders, which Juice Wrld had intended to make his next album. However, the label and Juice Wrld's grieving family chose to delay The Outsiders and first put a 15-track tribute album titled Legends Never Die that was announced on July 7, 2020. Two days after the album announcement, Juice's manager Lil Bibby hinted at a deluxe edition after fans demanded more songs. A new version of the album's final song "Man of the Year" was added in the track listing on July 14, 2020, just days after the album's release.

Promotion
"Righteous" was released on April 24, 2020, as the album's lead single, the song peaked at number 11 on the US Billboard Hot 100. "Tell Me U Luv Me" featuring Trippie Redd, was released on May 29, 2020, as the album's second single, the song peaked at number 38 on the Billboard Hot 100.

"Life's a Mess" featuring Halsey, was released on July 6, 2020, as the album's third single, the song peaked at number nine on the Billboard Hot 100. A teaser video of the album was released later that day. "Come & Go" featuring EDM producer Marshmello, was released on July 9, as the album's fourth single, the song peaked at number two on the Billboard Hot 100.

The album's fifth single, "Wishing Well", was sent to rhythmic contemporary radio on July 28, 2020, the song peaked at number five on the Billboard Hot 100. "Smile" featuring the Weeknd, was released on August 7, 2020, as the album's sixth single, the song peaked at number eight on the Billboard Hot 100.

Critical reception

Legends Never Die was met with generally positive reviews. At Metacritic, which assigns a normalized rating out of 100 to reviews from professional publications, the album received an average score of 75, based on 10 reviews. Aggregator AnyDecentMusic? gave it 7.2 out of 10, based on their assessment of the critical consensus.

Writing for Clash, Mike Milenko acclaimed the album, calling it "poetic, prophetic and poignant". Milenko further stated that the album's production works well with Wrld's voice and noted "Life's a Mess", "Come & Go", "Man of the Year" and "Wishing Well" as standouts from the record. However, Milenko opined that "some tracks are throwaway". Sheldon Pearce of The Guardian wrote that Legends Never Die is "overstuffed, sometimes underwritten and often puerile", but praise was directed towards Wrlds' performances on the album. Pearce also commended the way Wrld's "leading his listeners through their own angst", referring to the tracks "Bad Energy" and "Fighting Demons", on which Pearce opined that he "sounds like a patron saint of the melancholy masses". The Line of Best Fits reviewer Steven Loftin, who praised the album, wrote that it's "both a celebration and a standing document to the intricate mind he [Wrld] truly was, and it indeed does justice to a unique mind". A. D. Amorosi of Variety said, "Sonically, compared with Juice WRLD's early SoundCloud material, Legends Never Die, is positively lush – not over-produced, but comparatively elaborately arranged". Fred Thomas of AllMusic gave a positive review, stating, "Legends Never Die is as strong a collection of Juice WRLD songs as any, with already-searing songs made more intense by the shadow of their departed creator looming over the album". Brody Kenny of HipHopDX said, "Legends Never Die functions as a goodbye to and from Juice WRLD. His exact wishes for a post-death album might never be known, but this avoids feeling exploitative". Robert Christgau appraised Juice Wrld as an "anxiety-ridden melodicist" and went on to say: 

Other reviewers were less impressed. Dhruva Balram of NME called the album bloated and noted that it does "little to serve his [Wrld's] legacy justice". However, Barlam praised the first half of the album, while opining that the "intimacy" of Wrld's other projects is missing on Legends Never Die. Balram described the criticism as the following: "Despite the contagious nature of most of the tracks, that message is muted or left jumbled within a meandering album. Juice Wrld's music came to life most when he made it seem like you were the only two people in the room like he was speaking directly to you, the listener. That intimacy is sadly missing here." Brandon Caldwell of Pitchfork called the record repetitive at times, but stated that "the gripping parts of Legends Never Die come when Juice is speaking from the heart". Writing for Rolling Stone, Danny Schwartz wrote that "the album shines brightest when Juice stops navel-gazing, when he tempers his fatalism with a sense of hope and togetherness, the yang to his depressive yin". Schwartz noted the tracks "Righteous" and "Wishing Well" as standouts.

Year-end lists

Industry awards

Commercial performance
Legends Never Die debuted at number one on the US Billboard 200 with 497,000 album-equivalent units (including 209,000 pure album sales) in its first week, becoming the rapper's second number-one album. The album also accumulated a total of 422.63 million on-demand streams of the set's tracks in the week ending July 25. For the week ending July 25, 2020, a total of 17 of the album's songs charted on the US Billboard Hot 100, with five entries in the top 10: "Come & Go", "Wishing Well", "Conversations", "Life's a Mess", and "Hate the Other Side", which reached numbers two, five, seven, nine, and 10, respectively. This made Juice Wrld the third artist to ever achieve this, behind the Beatles and Drake; the album also became the most successful posthumous release in 20 years. "Life's a Mess" notably jumped from number 74 to number nine that week. Legends Never Die was the fifth best selling album of 2020 with 1.990 million album-equivalent units, including 301,000 pure copies in the United States.

In the United Kingdom, Legends Never Die debuted at number one on the UK Albums Chart with 22,000 album-equivalent units.

Track listing

Notes
  signifies a co-producer
  signifies an uncredited co-producer
  signifies an uncredited additional producer
 "Smile" was added to the album as part of a reissue on August 7, 2020.

Personnel
Credits adapted from the album's liner notes and Tidal.

 Juice Wrld – vocals (all tracks)
 Halsey – background vocals (13)
 Bibby – engineer (1, 10, 18, 22)
 Max Lord – engineer (2, 3, 9, 12–14, 16, 17, 20, 21), mixer (3, 5, 7, 16, 19), mastering engineer (5), recording engineer (5)
 Clint Gibbs – engineer (15)
 Kalani Thompson – engineer (15)
 Lloyd "2Fly" Mizell – engineer (15, 19)
 Tyler Sheppard – engineer (15)
 Tatsuya Sato – mastering engineer (1, 3, 4, 6, 9–14, 16–19, 21, 22)
 Dale Becker – mastering engineer (15)
 Serban Ghenea – mixer (15)
 Ben Lidsky – mixer (15, 18, 20)
 Manny Marroquin – mixer (2, 4, 6, 8–14, 17, 20)
 Rafael "Come2Brazil" Fadul – mixer (7)
 Chris Galland – assistant mixer (2, 4, 6, 9, 11–14, 17, 20)
 Jeremie Inhaber – assistant mixer (2, 4, 6, 9, 11–14, 17, 20)
 Robin Florent – assistant mixer (2, 4, 6, 9, 11–14, 17, 20)
 Colt Blumenthal – assistant mixer (21)
 KhaledBeats – recording arranger (1), string arranger (10, 18, 22)
 Hylton Mowday – strings (1, 10, 18)
 Brandon Buttner – vocal producer (13)

Charts

Weekly charts

Year-end charts

Certifications

Release history

References

2020 albums
Juice Wrld albums
Albums produced by Ronny J
Albums produced by Dr. Luke
Albums produced by Marshmello
Albums published posthumously
Albums produced by Nick Mira
Albums produced by Skrillex
Albums produced by Taz Taylor (record producer)
Interscope Records albums
Hip-hop albums released posthumously